Uttran is a  municipal district and a residential area of southwest Tumba, Botkyrka Municipality, Stockholm County, southeastern Sweden.

References

Populated places in Botkyrka Municipality
Södermanland